The Brazilian flathead (Percophis brasiliensis) is a species of duckbill which is the only species in the genus Percophis, the type genus of the monotypic subfamily Percophinae of the duckbill family Percophidae. It occurs in the south western Atlantic off the South American coast from southern Brazil to central Argentina.

References

Percophidae
Fish described in 1825